This is a list of film series that have seven entries.

C

Child's Play *
Child's Play (1988)
Child's Play 2 (1990)
Child's Play 3 (1991) 
Bride of Chucky (1998) 
Seed of Chucky (2004) 
Curse of Chucky (2013) (V)
Cult of Chucky (2017) (V)
Cinerama Adventures
This is Cinerama (1952)
Cinerama Holiday (1955)
Seven Wonders of the World (1956)
Search for Paradise (1957)
South Seas Adventure (1958)
The Best of Cinerama (1962)
Cinerama's Russian Adventure (1965)
City Hunter ****
City Hunter: .357 Magnum (1989)
City Hunter: Bay City Wars (1990)
City Hunter: Million Dollar Conspiracy (1990)
City Hunter: The Secret Service (1990) (TV)
City Hunter: Goodbye My Sweetheart (1997) (TV)
City Hunter: Death of the Vicious Criminal Ryo Saeba (1999) (TV)
City Hunter The Movie: Shinjuku Private Eyes (2019)
The Cohens and Kellys
The Cohens and Kellys (1926)
The Cohens and the Kellys in Paris (1928)
The Cohens and Kellys in Atlantic City (1929)
The Cohens and the Kellys in Scotland (1930)
The Cohens and the Kellys in Africa (1930)
The Cohens and Kellys in Hollywood (1932)
The Cohens and Kellys in Trouble (1933)

D

Dead End Kids
Dead End (1937)
Crime School (1938)
Angels with Dirty Faces (1938)
They Made Me a Criminal (1939)
Hell's Kitchen (1939)
The Angels Wash Their Faces (1939)
On Dress Parade (1939)
The Devil in Miss Jones
The Devil in Miss Jones (1973)
The Devil in Miss Jones 2 (1982)
The Devil in Miss Jones 3: A New Beginning (1986)
The Devil in Miss Jones 4: The Final Outrage (1986)
The Devil in Miss Jones 5: The Inferno (1995)
The Devil in Miss Jones 6 (1999)
The New Devil in Miss Jones (2005)
Digimon ***** (A)
Digimon: The Movie (2000)
Digimon Adventure 02: Revenge of Diaboromon (2001)
Digimon Tamers: Battle of Adventurers (2003)
Digimon Tamers: Runaway Locomon (2003)
Digimon Frontier: Island of Lost Digimon (2004)
Digital Monster X-Evolution (2005)
Digimon Savers: Ultimate Power! Activate Burst Mode!! (2006)
The Doctor Series *****
Doctor in the House (1954)
Doctor at Sea (1955)
Doctor at Large (1957)
Doctor in Love (1960)
Doctor in Distress (1963)
Doctor in Clover (1966)
Doctor in Trouble (1970)
Dr. Mabuse (Post-Fritz Lang series)
The Return of Doctor Mabuse (1961)
 (1962)
The Testament of Dr. Mabuse (1962)
 Scotland Yard Hunts Dr. Mabuse (1963)
The Secret of Dr. Mabuse (1964)
 (1970)
Dr. M (1990) (a.k.a. Club Extinction)
Dr. Orloff
Gritos en la noche (Screams in the Night) (1963) (a.k.a. The Awful Dr. Orloff)
El Secreto del Dr. Orloff (1964)
Miss Muerte (1966)
El Enigma del ataúd (1969)
La vie amoureuse de l'homme invisible (1971)
Los ojos siniestros del doctor Orloff (1973)
El Siniestro doctor Orloff (1982)
Dracula (Universal film series)
Dracula (1931)
Drácula (1931)*
Dracula's Daughter (1936)
Son of Dracula (1943)
House of Frankenstein (1944)
House of Dracula (1945)
Abbott and Costello Meet Frankenstein (1948)
 
Deep Throat
Deep Throat (1972)
Deep Throat Part II (1974)
Deep Throat II (1987)*
Deep Throat 3 (1989)
Deep Throat 4 (1990)
Deep Throat 5 (1991)
Deep Throat 6 (1992)

F

Fabian Bom
 (1948)
 (1949)
Tull-Bom (1951)
 (1952)
 (1953)
 (1958)
 (1959)
Far til fire (2005)
 (2005)
 (2006)
 (2008)
 (2010)
 (2011)
 (2012)
 (2014)
Francis the Talking Mule
Francis (1950)
Francis Goes to the Races (1951)
Francis Goes to West Point (1952)
Francis Covers the Big Town (1953)
Francis Joins the WACS (1954)
Francis in the Navy (1955)
Francis in the Haunted House (1956)
Frankenstein (Hammer film series)
The Curse of Frankenstein (1957)
The Revenge of Frankenstein (1958)
The Evil of Frankenstein (1964)
Frankenstein Created Woman (1967)
Frankenstein Must Be Destroyed (1969)
The Horror of Frankenstein (1970)
Frankenstein and the Monster from Hell (1974)

G

Godzilla **** Heisei era (1984–1995) 
The Return of Godzilla (1984)
Godzilla vs. Biollante (1989)
Godzilla vs. King Ghidorah (1991)
Godzilla vs. Mothra (1992)
Godzilla vs. Mechagodzilla II (1993)
Godzilla vs. SpaceGodzilla (1994)
Godzilla vs. Destoroyah (1995)
Galaxy Express 999 * (A)
Galaxy Express 999 (film) (1979)
Ginga tetsudô Three-Nine: Garasu no Kurea (1980)
Ginga tetsudô Three-Nine: Kimi wa haha no yô ni aiseru ka!! (1980) (TV)
Sayônara, ginga tetsudô Surî-Nain: Andromeda shûchakueki (1981)
Ginga tetsudô Three-Nine: Eien no tabibito Emeraldas (1980) (TV)
Ginga tetsudô Three-Nine: Eternal Fantasy (1998)
Ginga tetsudô Three-Nine: Fumetsu no kûkan kidô (2000)
Gidget **
Gidget (1959)
Gidget Goes Hawaiian (1961)
Gidget Goes to Rome (1963)
Gidget Grows Up (1969) (TV)
Gidget Gets Married (1972) (TV)
Gidget Makes the Wrong Connection (1972) (TV)
Gidget's Summer Reunion (1985) (TV)
Guinea Pig
Guinea Pig: Devil's Experiment (1985)(a.k.a. Guinea Pig: Unabridged Agony)
Guinea Pig 2: Flower of Flesh and Blood (1985)
Guinea Pig 3: He Never Dies (1986) (a.k.a. Guinea Pig 3: Shudder! The Man Who Doesn't Die)
Guinea Pig 4: Mermaid in a Manhole (1988)
Guinea Pig 5: Android of Notre Dame (1988)
Guinea Pig 6: Devil Doctor Woman (1990)
Guinea Pig 7: Slaughter Special (1991)

H
 
Hildegarde Withers
The Penguin Pool Murder (1932)
Murder on the Blackboard (1934)
Murder on a Honeymoon (1935)
Murder on a Bridle Path (1936)
The Plot Thickens (1936)
Forty Naughty Girls (1937)
A Very Missing Person (1972) (TV)
Hurricane Hutch
Hurricane Hutch (1921) (Serial)
Go Get 'Em Hutch (1922) (Serial)
Hutch Stirs 'em Up (1923)
Hurricane Hutch in Many Adventures (1924)
Hutch of the U.S.A. (1924)
Lightning Hutch (1926) (Serial)
Hidden Aces (1927)

K

Kommissar X
Hunt for the Unknown (1965) (a.k.a. Kiss Kiss Kill Kill)
Three Yellow Cats (1966) (a.k.a. Death is Nimble, Death is Quick)
So Darling So Deadly (1966)
Death Trip (1967)
 (1968) (a.k.a. Kill Panther Kill)Three Golden Serpents (1968) (a.k.a. The Island of Lost Girls)FBI: Operation Pakistan (1971) (a.k.a. Tiger Gang)

LLassie *****Lassie Come Home (1943)Son of Lassie (1945)Courage of Lassie (1946)Hills of Home (1948)The Sun Comes Up (1949)Challenge to Lassie  (1950)The Painted Hills (1951)LeprechaunLeprechaun (1993) Leprechaun 2 (1994) Leprechaun 3 (1995) (V)Leprechaun 4: In Space (1997) (V)Leprechaun in the Hood (2000) (V)Leprechaun: Back 2 tha Hood (2003) (V)Leprechaun Returns (2018) (TV)Die Lümmel von der ersten BankZur Hölle mit den Paukern (1968)Zum Teufel mit der Penne (1968) (1969)Hurra, die Schule brennt! (1969)We'll Take Care of the Teachers (1970)Morgen fällt die Schule aus (1971) (1972)Lum and AbnerDreaming Out Loud (1940)The Bashful Bachelor (1942)Two Weeks to Live (1943)So This Is Washington (1943)Goin' to Town (1944)Partners in Time (1946)Lum and Abner Abroad (1956) 

OOffice Lady JournalOffice Lady Journal: Scent of Female Cat (1972)Office Lady Journal: Affair of Female Cat (1972)Office Lady Journal: Poaching (1973)Office Lady Journal: Wet Bundle (1974)Office Lady Journal: Ruined Lust (1974)Office Lady Journal: Indecent Relations (1975)Erotic Diary of An Office Lady (1977)Oss 117 (original series) 
 OSS 117 n'est pas mort (1956)
 OSS 117 se déchaîne (1963)
 Banco à Bangkok pour OSS 117 (1964)
 Furia à Bahia pour OSS 117 (1965)
 Atout coeur à Tokyo pour OSS 117 (1966)
 Pas de roses pour OSS 117 (1968)
 OSS 117 takes a vacation (1970)

PPierino *Pierino contro tutti (1981)Pierino il fichissimo (1981)Che casino... con Pierino! (1982)Pierino la peste alla riscossa (1982)Pierino colpisce ancora (1982)Quella peste di Pierina (1982)Pierino torna a scuola (1990)Police Academy **Police Academy (1984)Police Academy 2: Their First Assignment (1985)Police Academy 3: Back in Training (1986)Police Academy 4: Citizens on Patrol (1987)Police Academy 5: Assignment Miami Beach (1988)Police Academy 6: City Under Siege (1989)Police Academy: Mission to Moscow (1994)Paranormal ActivityParanormal Activity (2007)Paranormal Activity 2 (2010) (prequel)Paranormal Activity 3 (2011) (prequel)Paranormal Activity 4 (2012)  Paranormal Activity: The Marked Ones (2014) Paranormal Activity: The Ghost Dimension (2015)Paranormal Activity: Next of Kin (2021)

RRoad to...Road to Singapore (1940)Road to Zanzibar (1941)Road to Morocco (1942)Road to Utopia (1946)Road to Rio (1947)Road to Bali (1952)The Road to Hong Kong (1962)

SSamadSamad va ghalicheyeh hazrat soleyman (1971)Samad va fulad zereh div (1971)Samad va sami, leila va leili (1972)Samad be madreseh miravad (1973)Samad Artist Mishavad (1974)Samad khoshbakht mishavad (1975)Samad dar rah ejdeha (1977)The Seven Deadly SinsEnvy (1917)Pride (1917)Greed (1917)Sloth (1917)Passion (1917)Wrath (1917)The Seventh Sin (1917)Smokey and the BanditSmokey and the Bandit (1977)Smokey and the Bandit II (1980)Smokey and the Bandit Part 3 (1983)Bandit Goes Country (1994) (TV)Bandit Bandit (1994) (TV)Beauty and the Bandit (1994) (TV)Bandit's Silver Angel (1994) (TV)St Trinian's SchoolThe Belles of St Trinian's (1954)Blue Murder at St Trinian's (1957)The Pure Hell of St Trinian's (1958)The Great St Trinian's Train Robbery (1966)The Wildcats of St Trinian's (1980)St Trinian's (2007)St Trinian's: The Legend of Fritton's Gold (2009) The Super Dimension Fortress Macross *The Super Dimension Fortress Macross: Do You Remember Love? (1984)The Super Dimension Fortress Macross: Flash Back 2012 (1987) (V)The Super Dimension Fortress Macross II: Lovers, Again (1991) (V)Macross Plus (1995) (V)Macross 7 The Movie: The Galaxy Is Calling Me! (1995)Macross Frontier The Movie: The False Diva (2008)Macross Frontier Movie: The Wings of Goodbye (2009)

TThe Teen-AgersJunior Prom (1946)Freddie Steps Out (1946)High School Hero (1946)Vacation Days (1947)Sarge Goes to College (1947)Smart Politics (1948)Campus Sleuth (1948)TremorsTremors (1990)Tremors 2: Aftershocks (1996) (V)Tremors 3: Back to Perfection (2001) (V)Tremors 4: The Legend Begins (2004) (V) (prequel)Tremors 5: Bloodlines (2015) (V)Tremors: A Cold Day in Hell (2018) (V)Tremors: Shrieker Island (2020) (V)The Texas Chainsaw MassacreThe Texas Chain Saw Massacre (1974)The Texas Chainsaw Massacre 2 (1986)Leatherface: The Texas Chainsaw Massacre III (1990)Texas Chainsaw Massacre: The Next Generation (1994)Texas Chainsaw 3D (2013)Leatherface (2017) (prequel)Texas Chainsaw Massacre (2022)TransformersTransformers (2007)Transformers: Revenge of the Fallen (2009)Transformers: Dark of the Moon (2011)Transformers: Age of Extinction (2014)Transformers: The Last Knight (2017)Bumblebee (2018) (prequel)Transformers: Rise of the Beasts (2023) (prequel)

ZZoom UpZoom Up: Rape Site (1979)Zoom In: Rape Apartments (1980)Zoom Up: Woman From The Dirty Magazine (1980)Zoom Up: Sexual Crime Report (1981)Zoom Up: Genuine Look At A Stripper (1982)Zoom Up: Graduation Photos (1984)Zoom Up: Special Masturbation'' (1986)

07
^